Mohamed Abdel Wahed (born 19 January 1981) is a retired Egyptian footballer. He was a member of Egypt's U-21 national team, which got the bronze medal in the 2001 FIFA World Youth Championship held in Argentina.

Titles as a player
Personal
Best Egyptian Rising Star (2001) by Akhbar El-Yom

He is a muslim 

3 For Egypt
World Youth Cup Bronze Medalist with Egyptian Team 2001
Francophone Games' Bronze Medalist with Egyptian Olympic Team 2001
African Youth Cup of Nations 3rd place 2001

9 For Zamalek
2 Egyptian League title (2002/2003 & 2003/2004)
2 Egyptian Super Cup (2000/2001 & 2001/2002)
1 Egyptian Cup Titles (2001/2002)
1 African Champions League title (2002)
1 African Super Cup title (2003)
1 Arab Club Championship Title (2003)
1 Egyptian Saudi Super Cup (2003)

References

External links

1981 births
Living people
Egyptian expatriate footballers
Egypt international footballers
Zamalek SC players
Egyptian footballers
Ismaily SC players
Tersana SC players
Lierse S.K. players
KFC Turnhout players
Belgian Pro League players
Expatriate footballers in Belgium
Egyptian expatriate sportspeople in Belgium
Egyptian Premier League players
Footballers from Cairo
Association football defenders